The Edelweiss Vacation Village and Campground is a U.S. Department of Defense recreational facility that is a part of the Edelweiss Lodge and Resort in Garmisch, Germany.  The Vacation Village and Campground consists of a collection of deluxe and rustic wood cabins located on Artillery Kaserne in Southern Garmisch, and a gravel campsite in the Loisach River Valley.  The Tent and Gravel Campsites are closed from October to Mid-May, but the cabins are open all year round.

External links
Edelweiss Lodge and Resort
Edelweiss Vacation Village and Campground Photos

Hotels in Germany
Buildings and structures in Garmisch-Partenkirchen (district)
Armed Forces Recreation Centers